Qazi Khalid Ali is a Pakistani educationist, lawyer and politician. He is the first vice-chancellor of Shaheed Zulfiqar Ali Bhutto University of Law.

He has been the Additional Advocate General and also was appointed as Education Minister in 1997. He was appointed as an additional judge of the High Court of Sindh however since his appointment happened at a time when the Constitution of Pakistan had been suspended by Pervez Musharraf and replaced by the Provisional Constitutional Order, his appointment was declared void ab initio by the Supreme Court's order in the PCO Judges case.

References

Year of birth missing (living people)
Living people
Pakistani academic administrators
Pakistani educators
Pakistani politicians